Jovan Zdravevski (born 22 April 1980) is a Macedonian-Icelandic former professional basketball player who last played for Eos Lund IK. In 2008, he became a naturalized citizen of Iceland where he played from 2004 to 2013, when he moved to Sweden.

References

External links
 Profile at Realgm.com
 Profile at Eurobasket.com
 Profile at Proballers.com
 Swedish statistics at Basket.se

1980 births
Living people
Jovan Zdravevski
Jovan Zdravevski
Jovan Zdravevski
Macedonian men's basketball players
Jovan Zdravevski
Small forwards
Jovan Zdravevski
Jovan Zdravevski